City Barbeque is a fast-casual barbeque chain founded in Columbus, Ohio in 1999 by current CEO Rick Malir. City Barbeque has 46 company-owned  restaurants across six states and is headquartered in Dublin, Ohio.

History 
City Barbeque founder Rick Malir grew up on a farm in rural Kansas and, as a teenager, served as National FFA president from 1985 to 1986. He was introduced to barbeque in college at Kansas State University, where he earned a degree in agricultural economics; Malir also holds an MBA from the University of Illinois. Following graduation, he took a job with John Deere’s marketing and dealer development team, but was always interested in starting his own company. After meeting John Kean, Jim Budros and Mike Taylor, who comprised the award-winning competition BBQ team the Barbeque Boys, Malir decided to start his company: a barbeque restaurant. Malir left John Deere and teamed up with restaurant industry veteran Frank Pizzo  and Kean, Budros, and Taylor to found City Barbeque.

The first City Barbeque location opened in a former doughnut shop in Upper Arlington, Ohio (located at 2111 W Henderson Road, Columbus, Ohio, and still in operation as of 2022). A number of delays pushed back the opening of that first location, so Malir started fulfilling catering orders out of his home to sustain the business while waiting for the restaurant to be ready.

Menu 
City Barbeque serves beef brisket, pulled pork, turkey breast, pulled chicken with ‘Bama sauce, smoked sausage, bone-in chicken, and St. Louis–cut ribs; all meats are smoked in on-site smokers at each location. Sides include fresh-cut fries, green beans with bacon, mac & cheese, sweet vinegar slaw, corn pudding, hush puppies, cornbread, collards with pork, potato salad, side salads, and baked beans with brisket. The menu also includes salads, samplers, and three desserts: peach cobbler, banana pudding, and triple chocolate cake.

City Barbeque smokes meats and makes sides and desserts in each restaurant daily.

Awards 
City Barbeque’s food has been recognized by the Kansas City Barbeque Society (American Royal Invitational World Champion Brisket), Restaurant Hospitality magazine ("More Cowbell," which the publication named one of the country’s best sandwiches), the National Turkey Federation (Turkey on the Menu, Fast Casual category), Cooking with Paula Deen (Ten to Try: Banana Pudding), and more. The restaurant itself has been named the top barbeque restaurant in Columbus by Business Insider in 2012, one of the top 25 barbeque spots in the country by Men’s Journal in 2014, and the country's second best barbeque chain by The Daily Meal in 2017. In 2018, City Barbeque was named to QSR’s 40/40 list; in 2017, it held the #48 spot on Restaurant Business’s Future 50.

City Barbeque's business has received recognition as well. The company has been named best employer (under 500 employees) in Columbus, Ohio from 2016–2018. In 2018, City Barbeque founder Rick Malir received a Smart 50 Award, awarded by Smart Business Columbus to "recognize the top executives of the 50 smartest companies in the region for their ability to effectively build and lead successful organizations". City Barbeque received a Pillar Award for Community Service—a recognition honoring "organizations that set the standard for outstanding service to their communities"—in 2019. Also in 2019, TDn2K named City Barbeque the Best Practices Award recipient for the fast-casual category, a recognition of "consistently superior performance and results among the hundreds of companies tracked by People Report".

Culture 
City Barbeque’s culture is centered on food quality, service, continuous improvement, and fulfillment of the company’s purpose: "serving and creating happiness". The company pays wages above industry averages and provides scholarship opportunities to employees and their children.

Each City Barbeque location serves its local community by giving back about 10% of pre-tax profits to local charities and non-profits; donating food to community events  and food-insecure families via Food Rescue; and raising funds for organizations such as the American Cancer Society, the Resurrecting Lives Foundation, Mission 22, and the FFA.

References 

1999 establishments in Ohio
American companies established in 1999
Barbecue restaurants in the United States
Companies based in Dublin, Ohio
Restaurant chains in the United States